Herbert Sieronski (8 November 1906 – 1 January 1945) was a German racing cyclist. He rode in the 1931 Tour de France.

References

External links
 

1906 births
1945 deaths
German male cyclists
Place of birth missing
German military personnel killed in World War II
Cyclists from Berlin